Hough End tram stop was a proposed tram stop on the phase 3b plans to Manchester Airport. It was originally due to open in 2016 but was dropped from the plans.

References
 https://web.archive.org/web/20110716213530/http://www.tfgm.com/pdfmaps/metrolink_phase3.pdf

Proposed Manchester Metrolink tram stops